"Tara" is the second single from Moya Brennan's Grammy-nominated album Two Horizons, released in the same year. The cover shows a photography by Peer Lindgreen.

Track listing 
Tara (single mix)
Tara
Tara (Schiller mix)

References

2003 singles
Songs written by Ross Cullum
2003 songs